First-Year Student is a 1948 Soviet film directed by Ilya Frez.

Plot 
The film tells about a girl named Marusya Orlova, who went to school. A teacher and new friends will help her to become a disciplined, sociable and sympathetic person.

Starring 
 Natalya Zashchipina as Marusja (as Natasha Zashchipina)
 Tamara Makarova as Teacher
 Tatyana Barysheva as Grandmother
 Kira Golovko
 Igor Iroschkin as Seresha
 Katya Ivanova as Mother
 Yelena Yegorova

References

External links 
 

1948 films
1940s Russian-language films
Soviet black-and-white films